Ewart Nicholson (born 22 October 1993) is a Trinidadian cricketer who played for Trinidad and Tobago. He made his first-class debut for Trinidad and Tobago in the 2015–16 Regional Four Day Competition on 18 March 2016. He made his List A debut for Trinidad and Tobago in the 2017–18 Regional Super50 on 15 February 2018.

See also
 List of Trinidadian representative cricketers

References

External links
 

1993 births
Living people
Trinidad and Tobago cricketers